Aedes (Verrallina) indicus is a species complex of zoophilic mosquito belonging to the genus Aedes. It is found in India and Sri Lanka It is known to infect Japanese Encephalitis.

References

External links
A REVIEW OF THE SPECIES OF SUBGENUS GENUSAEDES, FROM SRI LANKA AND A XVI. VERRALLINA , REVISED DESCRIPTION OF THE SUBGENUS (DIPTERA : c ULICIDAE) 
Sero-entomological investigations on Japanese encephalitis outbreak in Gorakhpur division, Uttar Pradesh, India
SEASONAL ABUNDANCE AND DISTRIBUTION OF MOSQUITOES

indicus
Insects described in 1907